Deuteraphorura kruberaensis is a species of  springtails belonging to the family Onychiuridae. It is endemic to the Krubera-Voronja cave system in Georgia. It is one of the deepest terrestrial animal ever found on Earth, living at > below the cave entrance.  It was discovered in the CAVEX Team expedition of 2010.

References

Collembola
Fauna of Georgia (country)
Animals described in 2012
Cave arthropods